The ISO/IEC 27000-series (also known as the 'ISMS Family of Standards' or 'ISO27K' for short) comprises information security standards published jointly by the International Organization for Standardization (ISO) and the International Electrotechnical Commission (IEC).

The series provides best practice recommendations on information security management—the management of information risks through information security controls—within the context of an overall Information security management system (ISMS), similar in design to management systems for quality assurance (the ISO 9000 series), environmental protection (the ISO 14000 series) and other management systems.

The series is deliberately broad in scope, covering more than just privacy, confidentiality and IT/technical/cybersecurity issues.  It is applicable to organizations of all shapes and sizes.  All organizations are encouraged to assess their information risks, then treat them (typically using information security controls) according to their needs, using the guidance and suggestions where relevant.  Given the dynamic nature of information risk and security, the ISMS concept incorporates continuous feedback and improvement activities to respond to changes in the threats, vulnerabilities or impacts of incidents.

The standards are the product of ISO/IEC JTC 1 (Joint Technical Committee 1) SC 27 (Subcommittee 27), an international body that meets in person (face-to-face or virtually) twice a year.

The ISO/IEC standards are sold directly by ISO, mostly in English, French and Chinese.  Sales outlets associated with various national standards bodies also sell directly translated versions in several languages.

Early history
Many people and organisations are involved in the development and maintenance of the ISO27K standards.  The first standard in this series was ISO/IEC 17799:2000; this was a fast-tracking of the existing British standard BS 7799 part 1:1999. The initial release of BS 7799 was based, in part, on an information security policy manual developed by the Royal Dutch/Shell Group in the late 1980s and early 1990s.  In 1993, what was then the Department of Trade and Industry (United Kingdom) convened a team to review existing practice in information security, with the goal of producing a standards document.  In 1995, the BSI Group published the first version of BS 7799. One of the principal authors of BS 7799 recalls that, at the beginning of 1993, "The DTI decided to quickly assemble a group of industry representatives from seven different sectors: Shell ([David Lacey] and Les Riley), BOC Group (Neil Twist), BT (Dennis Willets), Marks & Spencer (Steve Jones), Midland Bank (Richard Hackworth), Nationwide (John Bowles) and Unilever (Rolf Moulton)."  David Lacey credits the late Donn B. Parker as having the "original idea of establishing a set of information security controls", and with producing a document containing a "collection of around a hundred baseline controls" by the late 1980s for "the I-4 Information Security circle which he conceived and founded.

Published standards 
The published ISO27K standards related to "information security, cybersecurity and privacy protection" are: 
ISO/IEC 27000 — Information security management systems — Overview and vocabulary
ISO/IEC 27001 — Information security, cybersecurity and privacy protection — Information security management systems — Requirements. - specifies requirements for an information security management system in the same formalized, structured and succinct manner as other ISO standards specify other kinds of management systems.
ISO/IEC 27002 — Information security, cybersecurity and privacy protection — Information security controls  - essentially a detailed catalog of information security controls that might be managed through the ISMS
ISO/IEC 27003 — Information security management system implementation guidance
ISO/IEC 27004 — Information security management — Monitoring, measurement, analysis and evaluation
ISO/IEC 27005 — Guidance on managing information security risks
ISO/IEC 27006 — Requirements for bodies providing audit and certification of information security management systems
ISO/IEC 27007 — Guidelines for information security management systems auditing (focused on auditing the management system)
ISO/IEC TR 27008 — Guidance for auditors on ISMS controls (focused on auditing the information security controls)
ISO/IEC 27009 — Information technology — Security techniques — Sector-specific application of ISO/IEC 27001 — Requirements
ISO/IEC 27010 — Information security management for inter-sector and inter-organizational communications
ISO/IEC 27011 — Information security management guidelines for telecommunications organizations based on ISO/IEC 27002
ISO/IEC 27013 — Guideline on the integrated implementation of ISO/IEC 27001 and ISO/IEC 20000-1 
ISO/IEC 27014 — Information security governance. (Mahncke assessed this standard in the context of Australian e-health.)
ISO/IEC TR 27015 — Information security management guidelines for financial services (now withdrawn)
ISO/IEC TR 27016 — information security economics
ISO/IEC 27017 — Code of practice for information security controls based on ISO/IEC 27002 for cloud services
ISO/IEC 27018 — Code of practice for protection of personally identifiable information (PII) in public clouds acting as PII processors
ISO/IEC 27019 — Information security for process control in the energy industry
ISO/IEC 27021 — Competence requirements for information security management systems professionals
ISO/IEC TS 27022 — Guidance on information security management system processes – under development
ISO/IEC TR 27023 — Mapping the revised editions of ISO/IEC 27001 and ISO/IEC 27002
ISO/IEC 27028 — Guidance on ISO/IEC 27002 attributes
ISO/IEC 27031 — Guidelines for information and communication technology readiness for business continuity
ISO/IEC 27032 — Guideline for cybersecurity
ISO/IEC 27033-1 — Network security – Part 1: Overview and concepts
ISO/IEC 27033-2 — Network security – Part 2: Guidelines for the design and implementation of network security 
ISO/IEC 27033-3 — Network security – Part 3: Reference networking scenarios — Threats, design techniques and control issues 
ISO/IEC 27033-4 — Network security – Part 4: Securing communications between networks using security gateways
ISO/IEC 27033-5 — Network security – Part 5: Securing communications across networks using Virtual Private Networks (VPNs)
ISO/IEC 27033-6 — Network security – Part 6: Securing wireless IP network access
ISO/IEC 27033-7 — Network security – Part 7: Guidelines for network virtualization security
ISO/IEC 27034-1 — Application security – Part 1: Guideline for application security
ISO/IEC 27034-2 — Application security – Part 2: Organization normative framework
ISO/IEC 27034-3 — Application security – Part 3: Application security management process
ISO/IEC 27034-4 — Application security – Part 4: Validation and verification (under development)
ISO/IEC 27034-5 — Application security – Part 5: Protocols and application security controls data structure
ISO/IEC 27034-5-1 — Application security — Part 5-1: Protocols and application security controls data structure, XML schemas
ISO/IEC 27034-6 — Application security – Part 6: Case studies
ISO/IEC 27034-7 — Application security – Part 7: Assurance prediction framework
ISO/IEC 27035-1 — Information security incident management – Part 1: Principles of incident management
ISO/IEC 27035-2 — Information security incident management – Part 2: Guidelines to plan and prepare for incident response
ISO/IEC 27035-3 — Information security incident management – Part 3: Guidelines for ICT incident response operations
ISO/IEC 27035-4 — Information security incident management – Part 4: Coordination (under development)
ISO/IEC 27036-1 — Information security for supplier relationships – Part 1: Overview and concepts
ISO/IEC 27036-2 — Information security for supplier relationships – Part 2: Requirements
ISO/IEC 27036-3 — Information security for supplier relationships – Part 3: Guidelines for information and communication technology supply chain security
ISO/IEC 27036-4 — Information security for supplier relationships – Part 4: Guidelines for security of cloud services
ISO/IEC 27037 — Guidelines for identification, collection, acquisition and preservation of digital evidence
ISO/IEC 27038 — Specification for Digital redaction on Digital Documents
ISO/IEC 27039 — Intrusion prevention
ISO/IEC 27040 — Storage security
ISO/IEC 27041 — Investigation assurance
ISO/IEC 27042 — Analyzing digital evidence
ISO/IEC 27043 — Incident investigation
ISO/IEC 27050-1 — Electronic discovery — Part 1: Overview and concepts
ISO/IEC 27050-2 — Electronic discovery — Part 2: Guidance for governance and management of electronic discovery
ISO/IEC 27050-3 — Electronic discovery — Part 3: Code of practice for electronic discovery
ISO/IEC 27050-4 — Electronic discovery — Part 4: Technical readiness
ISO/IEC TS 27110 — Information technology, cybersecurity and privacy protection — Cybersecurity framework development guidelines
ISO/IEC 27557 — Information security, cybersecurity and privacy protection — Application of ISO 31000:2018 for organizational privacy risk management
ISO/IEC 27701 — Information technology — Security Techniques — Information security management systems — Privacy Information Management System (PIMS). 
ISO 27799 — Information security management in health using ISO/IEC 27002 (guides health industry organizations on how to protect personal health information using ISO/IEC 27002)

In preparation 
Further ISO27K standards are in preparation covering aspects such as digital forensics AI/ML security and IoT security, while the released ISO27K standards are routinely reviewed and if appropriate updated every five years or so.

See also 
 ISO/IEC JTC 1/SC 27 - IT Security techniques
 BS 7799, the original British Standard from which ISO/IEC 17799, ISO/IEC 27002 and ISO/IEC 27001 were derived
 Document management system
 Sarbanes–Oxley Act
 Standard of Good Practice published by the Information Security Forum

References 

 
Information technology management
27000